Atavillos Bajo District is one of twelve districts of the province Huaral in Peru.

References